"Amok Time" is the second season premiere episode of the American science fiction television series  Star Trek. Written by science fiction author Theodore Sturgeon, scored by Gerald Fried, and directed by Joseph Pevney, it first aired on September 15, 1967.

The episode features First Officer Spock returning to his homeworld for a brutal Vulcan wedding ritual. It is the only episode of The Original Series to depict scenes on the planet Vulcan.

It was the first episode to air featuring Ensign Pavel Chekov (Walter Koenig) as the ship's navigator. It was also the first episode to list "DeForest Kelley as Dr. McCoy" in the opening credits, and the first episode broadcast in the series' new time slot of 8:30 pm on Friday night. This is the first episode to use the "Vulcan salute" and introduced the concept of pon farr.

Plot
Spock, the first officer of the USS Enterprise, begins to exhibit unusual behavior and requests that he be granted leave on his home planet Vulcan. Captain Kirk and Chief Medical Officer Dr. McCoy, having witnessed one of their friend's outbursts, agree and Kirk diverts the ship to Vulcan. En route, Kirk receives orders from Starfleet to travel to Altair VI to represent the Federation at the inauguration ceremony for the planet's new president. Though Kirk instructs the crew to set course to Altair VI, Spock secretly changes course back to Vulcan. Kirk confronts Spock, who claims to have no memory of ordering the course change.

Kirk orders Spock to Sick Bay, where McCoy finds evidence of extreme physical and emotional stress, a condition that will kill him within eight days if not treated. Spock is forced to explain that he is undergoing pon farr, a condition male Vulcans experience periodically throughout their adult life, and that he must mate or die. Kirk contacts Starfleet to request permission to divert to Vulcan but is denied. Kirk disobeys orders, believing that saving the life of his friend is more important than his career.

At Vulcan, Spock invites Kirk and McCoy to accompany him to the wedding ceremony. He explains that Vulcans are bonded as children so as to fulfill the pon farr commitment and that T'Pring is to be his mate. T'Pring arrives with Stonn, a pureblood Vulcan, whom she prefers to Spock. T'Pau, a matriarch renowned as the only person ever to refuse a seat on the Federation Council, prepares to conduct the ceremony. However, T'Pring demands the kal-if-fee, a physical challenge between Spock and a champion she selects. To everyone's surprise, she chooses Kirk instead of Stonn. Spock begs T'Pau to forbid it as Kirk is unaware of the implications, but T'Pau leaves the decision to Kirk; another champion will be selected if he refuses. Kirk accepts the challenge, only to learn that it is "to the death."

The two begin combat with lirpa, a traditional Vulcan weapon. Kirk is challenged by Spock's strength and agility, even in his current state, as well as the thinner atmosphere of Vulcan. McCoy convinces T'Pau to allow him to inject Kirk with a tri-ox compound to offset the effects of the Vulcan atmosphere. The battle continues, with Spock eventually garroting Kirk with an ahn'woon. McCoy rushes to Kirk's body and declares him dead, and requests immediate transport back to the Enterprise.

Spock renounces his claim on T'Pring but not before demanding an explanation from her. She explains that she feared losing Stonn in the kal-if-fee. By choosing Kirk, T'Pring would be assured of having Stonn in some capacity regardless of the outcome: If Spock was the victor, he would release her from the marriage (for having made the challenge in the first place), and if Kirk had won, he would not want her either. Spock, now free of the pon farr, compliments T'Pring on her flawless logic and returns to the Enterprise, warning Stonn that "having is not so pleasing a thing after all as wanting."

Aboard the ship, Spock announces his intent to resign his commission and submit himself for trial for killing Kirk, when he discovers Kirk is alive and well in sickbay. McCoy explains that the injection he gave Kirk was a neuroparalyzer drug that merely simulated death. Asked about what followed, Spock states that he lost all desire for T'Pring after he thought he had killed Kirk. Kirk then learns that Starfleet, at T'Pau's request, has belatedly given the Enterprise permission to travel to Vulcan.

Reception
For the franchise's 30th anniversary, TV Guide ranked "Amok Time" No. 2 on its list of the 10 best Star Trek episodes. In 2009, Zack Handlen of The A.V. Club gave the episode an A rating. In 2012, The A.V. Club ranked this episode as one of top ten "must see" episodes of the original series.

In 2012, The Christian Science Monitor ranked this the best episode of the original Star Trek.

In 2014, Gizmodo ranked "Amok Time" as the 12th best episode of Star Trek, out of the over 700 ones made by that time. IGN ranked "Amok" number 9 in a top ten list of original series episodes.

In 2015, Wired magazine did not recommend skipping this episode in their binge-watching guide for the original series.

In 2015, Polygon ranked "Amok Time" as one of the three best Spock-centric episodes of Star Trek.

In 2015, SyFy ranked this episode as one of the top ten essential Star Trek original series episodes.

In 2015, New York Public Library cited this episode as having Spock's second best scene in the show.

In 2016, The Hollywood Reporter rated "Amok Time" the 28th best television episode of all Star Trek franchise television prior to Star Trek: Discovery, including live-action and the animated series but not counting the movies. In 2016, Newsweek ranked "Amok Time" as one of the best episodes of the original series, noting it has one of the most memorable fights in Star Trek. In 2016, Business Insider ranked "Amok Time" the 10th best episode of the original series.

In 2016, Radio Times ranked the duel between Kirk and Spock on Vulcan as the 15th best moment in all Star Trek. They note this shows the audience the Vulcan home planet of Vulcan for the first time, and also introduces the Pon Farr aspect of Vulcan culture.

In 2017, Business Insider ranked "Amok Time" the 10th best episode of the original series. They note this is the first episode to use the phrase "Live Long and Prosper" in Star Trek.

In 2018, Collider ranked this episode the second best original series episode.

In 2018, PopMatters ranked this the 10th best episode of the original series. They highlighted Spock's line "After a time, you may find that having is not so pleasing a thing after all as wanting. It is not logical, but it is often true." while noting the introduction of planet Vulcan, Pon Farr, various guest stars, and what they call a "thrilling gladiatorial battle".

A 2018 Star Trek binge-watching guide by Den of Geek recommended this episode as one of the best of the original series.

In 2019, Nerdist included this episode on their "Best of Spock" binge-watching guide.

In 2019, CBR ranked this episode as one of the top 8 most memorable episodes of the original Star Trek.

Legacy
Gerald Fried's incidental music for the fight—titled The Ritual/Ancient Battle/2nd Kroykah—became a standard underscore for combat scenes in season 2. It was notably spoofed during the Medieval Times sequence in the Jim Carrey film The Cable Guy (1996).

Leonard Nimoy first used his signature Vulcan salute in this episode.

The chart-topping British pop band T'Pau took their name from the Vulcan matriarch who presides over events on the planet.

The Omegaverse genre of speculative erotic fiction is noted as having been influenced by the episode.

References

External links

 

 "Amok Time" Preview of the remastered version at TrekMovie.com

1967 American television episodes
Altair in fiction
Star Trek: The Original Series (season 2) episodes
Works by Theodore Sturgeon
Television episodes directed by Joseph Pevney